= Steven M. Gursten =

American trial lawyer

- Education: University of Michigan, Fordham University School of Law
- Occupation: Attorney
- Employer: Michigan Auto Law
- Known for: Automobile accident litigation, trucking litigation, and commentary on Michigan no-fault insurance law
- Website: www.michiganautolaw.com

Steven M. Gursten is an American trial lawyer based in Michigan. He is Managing Partner and President of Michigan Auto Law, a personal injury law firm concentrating on automobile accident, trucking accident, motorcycle accident, and Michigan no-fault insurance litigation.

== Education ==
Gursten has written and spoken publicly on issues involving automobile insurance reform, distracted driving, traumatic brain injury litigation, and trucking safety. In 2013, Bridge Michigan published a guest column by Gursten outlining proposals for reforming Michigan's automobile insurance system.

== Career ==
Gursten practices personal injury law with a focus on automobile accident and trucking accident litigation. He has held leadership positions within national trial-lawyer organizations, including groups focused on distracted driving litigation, trucking litigation, and traumatic brain injury litigation.

== Legal commentary and public profile ==
Gursten has written and spoken publicly on issues involving automobile insurance reform, distracted driving, traumatic brain injury litigation, and trucking safety. In 2013, ''Bridge Michigan'' published a guest column by Gursten outlining proposals for reforming Michigan's automobile insurance system.

Gursten has also been interviewed by national and regional news organizations on automobile and transportation law. In 2016, The Wall Street Journal quoted him in reporting on large trucking verdicts and their impact on insurance markets.

In 2017, CBS News interviewed Gursten for an investigation into federal oversight of school bus drivers, citing his analysis of differences between safety requirements for school bus drivers and other commercial drivers. He has also commented in the media on distracted-driving legislation and the interpretation of Michigan's hands-free driving law.

== Public policy commentary ==
Gursten has commented publicly on Michigan's no-fault insurance system and insurance reform proposals. In 2019, Crain's Detroit Business published a commentary by Gursten arguing that Michigan's no-fault reform legislation did not adequately address insurer claims-handling practices.

== Insurance-industry disputes ==
In 2024, Detroit Metro Times reported on a legal dispute involving Gursten, Michigan Auto Law, and CURE Auto Insurance arising from criticism of the insurer's business practices. The Detroit Free Press subsequently reported on the dispute and related defamation allegations involving CURE Auto Insurance and Gursten.

== Media appearances ==
Gursten has appeared in television coverage discussing automobile insurance issues and personal injury litigation matters. He has also spoken at legal conferences concerning traumatic brain injury litigation and insurance practices.

== Recognition ==
Michigan Lawyers Weekly has included Gursten in its legal-industry recognition features, including its "Go To Lawyers Power List" for personal injury law. Gursten received the American Association for Justice Trucking Litigation Group Hall of Fame Award.
